The Elektronika MK-61 is a third-generation non-BASIC, RPN programmable calculator which was manufactured in the Soviet Union during the years 1983 to 1994. Its original selling price was 85 rubles.

The MK-61 has 105 steps of volatile program memory and 15 memory registers. It functions using either three AA-size battery cells or a wall plug. It has a ten-digit (eight digit mantissa, two digit exponent) green vacuum fluorescent display.

External links
Datasheet for the MK 61 processor 
1970s-1980s pocket calculators database
Alfred Klomp's page on "Hacking the MK-61"
How to calculate on the Elektronika B3-34 (and similar calculators)
Elektronika MK-61 Operating Instructions, English translation
250 games for MK-52, MK-61
MK-Compiler easy programming on the MK-61 and MK-52.

Emulator
Online-emulator of МК-61 (accurate emulation of the calculator's firmware, with automatic input code and output the contents of registers and stack).
Emulator of МК-61 for Android (accurate emulation of the calculator's firmware, with ability to save states).
Extended emulator of МК-61 for Android
Here you can download an emulator of all Soviet Programmable Calculators
the page with a description of the emulator

Elektronika programmable calculators